Foley Stewart is an American singer-songwriter, born and raised in the Lower East Side of New York City; he currently resides and regularly plays shows in New York City.
 Critics have compared his music to Jeff Buckley, Elliott Smith and Neil Young. Stewart opened for Fran Healy on Healy's 2011 US and European Tour.

References

External links
 Official BandCamp Page
 

Living people
Year of birth missing (living people)
American singer-songwriters